Parkerson is a surname. Notable people with the surname include:

Jo Parkerson, British journalist
Michelle Parkerson, American filmmaker and academic
William F. Parkerson Jr. (1920–2003), American lawyer and politician